Down in Paris is a French film directed by Antony Hickling in 2021. It was first screened at Reeling: The Chicago LGBTQ+ International Film Festival and Out on Film Atlanta's LGBTQ Film Festival, United States.

Plot
The film revolves around a middle aged film director in the middle of a personal crisis. He heads into the Parisian night looking for answers.

Cast
 Antony Hickling: Richard Barlow
 Dominique Frot: Samantha
 Jean-Christophe Bouvet: Robert
 Manuel Blanc: Mathias
 Thomas Laroppe: Tom
 Claudius Pan: Damien
 Nina Bakhshayesh: Elizabeth
 Raphaël Bouvet: Frédéric
 Mike Fédée: Claude
 Emmanuel Barrouyer: Paul
 Geoffrey Couët: Simon

Awards
 Down in Paris wins: Best Director, Queer international Film Festival, Playa del Carmen, Mexico, Nov 2022 
 Down in Paris wins: Best Director for a Feature Film (International), Yellowstone International Film Festival, New Delhi, India, October 2022 
 Down In Paris wins Best Narrative Feature for the 39th Reeling: The Chicago LGBTQ+ International Film Festival OCT 2021 
 Antony Hickling for Down In Paris wins The Kim Renders Memorial Award for Outstanding Performance Reelout Queer Film Festival, Canada, Feb 2022 
 Down In Paris obtained the Arthouse Recommendation from the French Association of Arthouse Cinemas on Feb 24, 2022.

References

External links
 
 The Awards for Reeling 2021 

2021 films
Films set in Paris
French LGBT-related films
2020s French films